Chusquea asymmetrica is a species of grass in the family Poaceae. It is found only in Ecuador.

Conservation status
Chusquea asymmetrica is recorded to be vulnerable to becoming an endangered species. Six subpopulations are known to be found in Ecuador. These subpopulations are common to Parque Nacional Podocarpus. It has also been recorded that this species can be found in Bolivia.

References

asymmetrica
Endemic flora of Ecuador
Grasses of South America
Vulnerable flora of South America
Taxonomy articles created by Polbot
Taxobox binomials not recognized by IUCN